USS LST-937 was an  in the United States Navy. Like many of her class, she was not named and is properly referred to by her hull designation.

Construction
LST-937 was laid down on 11 July 1944, at Hingham, Massachusetts, by the Bethlehem-Hingham Shipyard; launched on 12 August 1944; and commissioned on 6 September 1944.

Service history
During World War II, LST-937 was assigned to the Asiatic-Pacific theater and participated in the Mindanao Island landings in April 1945.

Following the war, LST-937 performed occupation duty in the Far East and saw service in China until late May 1946. The ship was decommissioned on 24 May 1946, and transferred to the State Department on that date. She was transferred to the Republic of China by the State Department. She was struck from the Navy list on 3 July 1946.

Awards
LST-937 earned one battle star for World War II service.

Notes

Citations

Bibliography 

Online resources

External links
 

 

LST-542-class tank landing ships
World War II amphibious warfare vessels of the United States
Ships built in Hingham, Massachusetts
1944 ships